Messaging (also known as Microsoft Messaging) is an instant messaging Universal Windows Platform app for Windows 8/8.1, Windows 10 and Windows 10 Mobile. The mobile version allows SMS, MMS and RCS messaging. The desktop version is restricted to showing SMS messages sent via Skype, and billing SMS message from an LTE operator.

External links 
 Send a text message — Microsoft Support

References 

Windows components
Instant messaging